Ry Cuming (born 6 May 1988), better known by his stage name RY X, is an Australian singer, musician, songwriter, and record producer. He was the first artist signed to the Stockholm-based label Dumont Dumont.

Early life
Ry Cuming was born on 6 May 1988 on Woodford Island, where he became a surfer.

Career

Cuming has cited Pearl Jam and Jeff Buckley as his greatest influences, and started writing music at the age of 16 after hearing Buckley's 1994 album Grace. His song "Let Your Spirit Fly" appeared on the soundtrack of the 2006 film Hoot. He then moved to Los Angeles, where he was signed by Jive Records, releasing his self-titled debut album on 20 July 2010. He briefly toured with Maroon 5, becoming their opening act in select venues.

Cuming won the 2010 Dolphin Awards for "Best Pop Song" and "Best New Artist". In 2012, he collaborated with Frank Wiedemann to release "Howling" on the German record label Innervisions, including a remix by Âme. His EP Berlin, released on 28 August 2013, was made available as 12" vinyl and digital. The title track charted in France, Germany, and the United Kingdom. The track also caught the attention of singer Sam Smith, who covered it.

In 2014, Cuming became the lead singer of the band The Acid, which he formed with Los Angeles producer Freeland and Steve Nalepa. They released an album titled Liminal. Together with Frank Wiedemann he formed the band Howling and released a full length album Sacred Ground on Ninja Tune and Monkeytown Records. Cuming's single "Howling" was featured in the movie Everything, Everything. The remix by Âme was featured in the movie Taken 3.

In May 2016, Cuming released his second album Dawn through Infectious Records and Loma Vista Records. The album charted at #34 in the UK Album Charts as well as charting in Germany, France, Canada, and Australia. It gained favourable reception from the media, with a New York Times review saying, "His voice is a pearly, androgynous tenor, a vessel for liquid melancholy that blurs words at the edges. He stretches pop structures with repetition that grows devotional, obsessive, hypnotic." In support of the album, he began an extensive tour across Europe and the U.S. as well as appearing at many festivals throughout 2016, such as Barn on the Farm and the Montreux Jazz Festival.

In October 2018, Cuming confirmed that his third studio album, Unfurl, would be released in February 2019 via Infectious Music. The album announcement coincided with the release of a new single, "Untold", and the announcement of a global tour beginning in Europe that commenced the same month.

Discography

Albums

Extended plays

Singles

*Did not appear in the official Belgian Ultratop 50 charts, but rather in the bubbling under Ultratip charts.

Other appearances
 "Destiny" For You - EP (King Henry, 2017)

References

External links

Australian male singers
Australian songwriters
Australian guitarists
Australian tenors
Living people
Infectious Music artists
Australian male guitarists
1988 births